There are about 80 marae (Māori meeting grounds) in the Gisborne District of New Zealand. They include the marae of six iwi (tribes): Ngāti Porou, Te Aitanga-ā-Hauiti, Te Aitanga-a-Māhaki, Te Whānau-ā-Apanui, Ngai Tamanuhiri and Rongowhakaata.

In October 2020, the Government committed $14,267,895 from the Provincial Growth Fund to upgrade 59 marae in the district, with the intention of creating 393.6 jobs.

Gisborne

Tolaga Bay to Tokomaru Bay

Ruatoria and Tikitiki

Waipiro Bay and Te Puia Springs

Te Araroa and East Cape

See also
 Lists of marae in New Zealand
 List of schools in the Gisborne District

References

Gisborne District, List of marae in
Marae
Marae in the Gisborne District, List of